Worli creek is a creek located in  the Worli suburb of Mumbai, India. The Hornby Vellard project was started to block the Worli creek and prevent the low-lying areas of Bombay from being flooded at high tide.

References
The Hornby Vellard

Estuaries of Mumbai